A minor-planet moon is an astronomical object that orbits a minor planet as its natural satellite. , there are 457 minor planets known or suspected to have moons. Discoveries of minor-planet moons (and binary objects, in general) are important because the determination of their orbits provides estimates on the mass and density of the primary, allowing insights into their physical properties that are generally not otherwise accessible.

Several of the moons are quite large compared to their primaries: 90 Antiope, Mors–Somnus and Sila–Nunam (95%), Patroclus–Menoetius, Altjira and Lempo–Hiisi (90%, with Lempo–Paha at 50%). The largest known minor-planet moon in absolute size is Pluto's largest moon Charon, which itself has about half the diameter of Pluto.

The first modern era mention of the possibility of an asteroid satellite was in connection with an occultation of the bright star Gamma Ceti by the asteroid 6 Hebe in 1977. The observer, amateur astronomer Paul D. Maley, detected an unmistakable 0.5 second disappearance of this naked eye star from a site near Victoria, Texas. Many hours later, several observations were reported in Mexico attributed to the occultation by 6 Hebe itself. Although not confirmed, this documents the first formally documented case of a suspected companion of an asteroid.

There are also several known ring systems around distant objects (see: rings of Chariklo and Chiron).

Terminology 

In addition to the terms satellite and moon, the term "binary" (binary minor planet) is sometimes used for minor planets with moons, and "triple" for minor planets with two moons. If one object is much bigger it can be referred to as the primary and its companion as secondary. The term double asteroid is sometimes used for systems in which the asteroid and its moon are roughly the same size, while binary tends to be used independently from the relative sizes of the components. When binary minor planets are similar in size, the Minor Planet Center (MPC) refers to them as "binary companions" instead of referring to the smaller body as a satellite. A good example of a true binary is the 90 Antiope system, identified in August 2000. Small satellites are often referred to as moonlets.

Discovery milestones 

Prior to the era of the Hubble Space Telescope and space probes reaching the outer Solar System, attempts to detect satellites around asteroids were limited to optical observations from Earth. For example, in 1978, stellar occultation observations were claimed as evidence of a satellite for the asteroid 532 Herculina. However, later more-detailed imaging by the Hubble Telescope did not reveal a satellite, and the current consensus is that Herculina does not have a significant satellite. There were other similar reports of asteroids having companions (usually referred to as satellites) in the following years. A letter by astronomer Thomas Hamilton in the Sky & Telescope magazine at this time pointed to apparently simultaneous impact craters on Earth (for example, the Clearwater Lakes in Quebec), suggesting that these craters were caused by pairs of gravitationally bound objects.

Also in 1978, Pluto's largest moon Charon was discovered; however, at the time Pluto was still considered to be one of the major planets.

In 1993, the first asteroid moon was confirmed when the Galileo probe discovered the small Dactyl orbiting 243 Ida in the asteroid belt. The second was discovered around 45 Eugenia in 1998. In 2001, 617 Patroclus and its same-sized companion Menoetius became the first known binary asteroids in the Jupiter trojans. The first trans-Neptunian binary after Pluto–Charon, was optically resolved in 2002.

Multiple systems 

In 2005, the asteroid 87 Sylvia was discovered to have two satellites, making it the first known triple system (also called trinary minor planets). This was followed by the discovery of a second moon orbiting 45 Eugenia. Also in 2005, the dwarf planet  was discovered to have two moons, making it the second trans-Neptunian object after Pluto known to have more than one moon. Additionally, 216 Kleopatra and 93 Minerva were discovered to be trinary asteroids in 2008 and 2009 respectively. Since the first few triple minor planets were discovered, more continue to be discovered at a rate of about one a year. Most recently discovered were two moons orbiting large near-earth asteroid 3122 Florence, bringing the number of known trinary systems in the Solar System up to 16 (including the Pluto system).

The following table lists all satellites of triple systems (or higher multiplicities) chronologically by their discovery date, starting with Charon, discovered in 1978. The highest known multiplicities are for Pluto (a sextuple system) and 130 Elektra (a quadruple system).

Commonality 
The data about the populations of binary objects are still patchy. In addition to the inevitable observational bias (dependence on the distance from Earth, size, albedo and separation of the components) the frequency appears to be different among different categories of objects. Among asteroids, an estimated 2% would have satellites. Among trans-Neptunian objects (TNOs), an estimated 11% are thought to be binary or multiple objects, and the majority of the large TNOs have at least one satellite, including all four IAU-listed dwarf planets.

More than 50 binaries are known in each of the main groupings: near-Earth asteroids, belt asteroids, and trans-Neptunian objects, not including numerous claims based solely on light-curve variation.

Two binaries have been found so far among centaurs with semi-major axes smaller than Neptune. Both are double ring systems around 2060 Chiron and 10199 Chariklo, discovered in 1993–2011 and 2013 respectively.

Origin 
The origin of minor-planet moons is not currently known with certainty, and a variety of theories exist. A widely accepted theory is that minor-planet moons are formed from debris knocked off the primary by an impact. Other pairings may be formed when a small object is captured by the gravity of a larger one.

Formation by collision is constrained by the angular momentum of the components, i.e. by the masses and their separation. Close binaries fit this model (e.g. Pluto–Charon). Distant binaries however, with components of comparable size, are unlikely to have followed this scenario, unless considerable mass has been lost in the event.

The distances of the components for the known binaries vary from a few hundreds of kilometres (243 Ida, 3749 Balam) to more than 3000 km (379 Huenna) for the asteroids. Among TNOs, the known separations vary from 3,000 to 50,000 km.

Populations and classes 
What is "typical" for a binary system tends to depend on its location in the Solar System (presumably because of different modes of origin and lifetimes of such systems in different populations of minor planets).
 Among near-Earth asteroids, satellites tend to orbit at distances of the order of 3–7 primary radii, and have diameters two to several times smaller than the primary. Since these binaries are all inner-planet crossers, it is thought that tidal stresses that occurred when the parent object passed close to a planet may be responsible for the formation of many of them, although collisions are thought to also be a factor in the creation of these satellites.
 Among main-belt asteroids, the satellites are usually much smaller than the primary (a notable exception being 90 Antiope), and orbit around 10 primary radii away. Many of the binary systems here are members of asteroid families, and a good proportion of satellites are expected to be fragments of a parent body whose disruption after an asteroid collision produced both the primary and satellite.

 Among trans-Neptunian objects, it is common for the two orbiting components to be of comparable size, and for the semi-major axis of their orbits to be much larger − about 100 to 1000 primary radii. A significant proportion of these binaries are expected to be primordial.
 Pluto has five known moons. Its largest moon Charon is more than half the size of Pluto itself, and large enough to orbit a point outside Pluto's surface. In fact, each orbits the common barycenter between them, with Pluto's orbit entirely enclosed by Charon's; thus they form a binary system informally referred to as a double dwarf planet. Pluto's four other moons, Nix, Hydra, Kerberos, and Styx, are far smaller and orbit the Pluto–Charon system.
 Haumea has two moons with radii estimated around 155 km (Hiʻiaka) and 85 km (Namaka).
 47171 Lempo is a unique trans-Neptunian triple system: Lempo and its moon of roughly equal mass, Hiisi, form a close-proximity binary, separated by roughly 867 km. A second moon, Paha, orbits the Lempo–Hiisi binary at about 7411 km.
  has one known moon, Dysnomia. Its radius, based on its brightness, is estimated to be roughly between 150 and 350 km.

List 

, there are 457 minor planets (systems) with 477 known companions. The following table is a listing of the total number of these systems by orbital class:

Near-Earth objects 

This is a list of near-Earth asteroids with companions. Candidate binaries with an unconfirmed status are displayed on a dark background. For an overview, see summary and introduction.

Mars crossers 

This is a list of Mars-crossing asteroids with companions. Candidate binaries with an unconfirmed status are displayed on a dark background. For an overview, see summary and introduction.

Main-belt asteroids 

This is a list of main-belt asteroids with companions. Candidate binaries with an unconfirmed status are displayed on a dark background. For an overview, see summary and introduction.

The following binaries are double asteroids, with similarly sized components, and a barycenter outside of the larger object.

 90 Antiope — S/2000 (90) 1
 854 Frostia — S/2004 (854) 1
 1313 Berna — S/2004 (1313) 1
 2478 Tokai — S/2007 (2478) 1
 3169 Ostro — S/2005 (3169) 1
 3749 Balam — S/2002 (3749) 1
 3905 Doppler — S/2013 (3905) 1
 4674 Pauling — S/2004 (4674) 1
 4951 Iwamoto — S/2007 (4951) 1
 5674 Wolff — S/2015 (5674) 1
 8474 Rettig — S/2015 (8474) 1
 17246 Christophedumas — S/2004 (17246) 1
  — S/2011 (300163) 1

In addition, these bodies might be double asteroids, but due to errors in their size and orbit, it is uncertain.

 809 Lundia — S/2005 (809) 1
 1089 Tama — S/2003 (1089) 1
 1509 Esclangona — S/2003 (1509) 1
 4492 Debussy — S/2004 (4492) 1
 11264 Claudiomaccone — S/2003 (11264) 1
 22899 Alconrad — S/2003 (22899) 1

Jupiter trojans 

This is a list of Jupiter trojans with companions. Candidate binaries with an unconfirmed status are displayed on a dark background. For an overview, see summary and introduction.

Trans-Neptunian objects 

This is a list of trans-Neptunian objects with companions. Candidate binaries with an unconfirmed status are displayed on a dark background. This list gives the companion's orbital period (Ps) in days rather than hours. For an overview, see summary and introduction.

See also 
 Lists of astronomical objects
 
 
 Satellite system (astronomy)

References

External links 
 , Lecture at SETI talk 
 Orbits of Binary Asteroids with Adaptive Optics (Franck Marchis)
 Satellites and Companions of Minor Planets (CBAT)
 Asteroids with Satellites Johnston's Archive
 The VOBAD database  a web page built and designed by F. Marchis and his collaborators (UC-Berkeley/SETI Institute) which contains the parameters of 169 multiple asteroid systems (last update May 9, 2009)

 
 
Moons